HammerFall is a Swedish heavy metal band from Gothenburg. The band was formed in 1993 by ex-Ceremonial Oath guitarist Oscar Dronjak. As of February 2020 they have released 12 studio albums.

Studio albums

Live albums

Compilation albums

Singles

Video albums

Video Music
 "Hammerfall" (1997)
 "Glory To The Brave" (First Version) (1997)
 "Glory To The Brave" (Second Version) (1997)
 "Let The Hammer Fall" (live) (1998)
 "I Want You" (feat. Kai Hansen) (1999)
 "Renegade" (2000)
 "Always Will Be" (2000)
 "Hearts On Fire" (First Version) (2002)
 "Hearts On Fire" (Second Version) (2002)
 "Blood Bound" (2005)
 "Natural High" (2006)
 "The Fire Burns Forever" (2006)
 "Last Man Standing" (Extended Version) (2007)
 "Any Means Necessary" (2009)
 "A Legend Reborn" (live) (2011)
 "One More Time" (2011)
 "Gates Of Dalhalla" (live) (2012)
 "Threshold" (live) (2012)
 "Send Me A Sign" (live) (2011)
 "Hector's Hymn" (2014)
 "The Sacred Vow" (Lyric Video) (2016)
 "Hammer High" (2016)
 "Built To Last" (2017)
 "(We Make) Sweden Rock" (First Version) (2019)
 "(We Make) Sweden Rock" (Second Version) (2019)
 "One Against The World" (2019)
 "Dominion" (2019)
 "Second To One" (ft. Noora Louhimo) (2020)
 "Templars Of Steel" (live) (2021)
 "Renegade" (live) (2021)
 "Hammer Of Dawn" (2021)
 "Venerate Me" (Visualizer) (2022)
 "Brotherhood" (2022)
 "Riders Of The Storm" (Lyric Video) (2023)

References

External links 
 HammerFall

Heavy metal group discographies
Discographies of Swedish artists